The Besnard Lakes Are the Last of the Great Thunderstorm Warnings is the sixth studio album by Canadian psychedelic rock band the Besnard Lakes. It was released on January 29, 2021, on Flemish Eye Records in Canada, FatCat Records in the United States, and Full Time Hobby Records in the rest of the world.

Writing and composition 
The music featured on this album was originally written ten years prior as a single track film score. It was the band's first ever double album.

Critical reception 

The album was met with favourable reviews from critics. At Metacritic, which assigns a weighted average rating out of 100 to reviews from mainstream publications, this release received an average score of 81, based on 10 reviews, which indicates "universal acclaim". Review aggregator AnyDecentMusic? gave the release a 7.3/10 based on a critical consensus of 10 reviews.

Track listing

Personnel 
Taken from official website

 Olga Goreas – writer, producer, composer
 Philip Gosselin – mastering
 Jace Lasek – writer, producer, composer, mixing

Artwork
 Olga Goreas – handwritten font
 Todd Stewart – inside gatefold design
 Corri-Lynn Tetz – front and back cover
 Dave Thomas – album layout

References 

2021 albums
The Besnard Lakes albums
Full Time Hobby albums
FatCat Records albums